Darrell Demont "D. J." Chark Jr. (born September 23, 1996) is an American football wide receiver who is a free agent. He played college football at LSU.

Early years
Chark was born to Shirley and Darrell Chark on September 23, 1996. He played for a youth league as a running back in his hometown. He attended Alexandria Senior High School in Alexandria, Louisiana, where played high school football and ran track.

College career
Chark had offers from schools such as Memphis, Oklahoma State, Texas A&M, among others. He chose to commit to Louisiana State University (LSU) to play college football. Chark played at LSU from 2014 to 2017 under head coaches Les Miles and Ed Orgeron. After not recording a reception his first two years, he had 26 for 466 yards and three touchdowns as a junior in 2016. As a senior in 2017, he had 40 receptions for 874 yards and three touchdowns. Known for his straight-ahead speed, Chark earned the nickname "The Flash" during his time at LSU. He wore number 7 at LSU.

College statistics

Professional career
On December 18, 2017, it was announced that Chark had accepted his invitation to play in the 2018 Senior Bowl. On January 27, 2018, Chark played in the 2018 Reese's Senior Bowl and made two tackles and caught five passes for 160 receiving yards and a touchdown as part of Houston Texans head coach Bill O'Brien's South team that defeated the North 45–16. He led both teams in receiving yards and earned the Senior Bowl's co-MVP award. Chark's Senior Bowl performance immediately garnered him recognition as a top wide receiver prospect in the upcoming draft and he was widely praised among analysts, including Charles Davis and James Jones.

He attended the NFL Scouting Combine in Indianapolis and completed all of the combine and positional drills. His draft stock continued to rise after he tied for fourth among all players in the 40-yard dash, tied for ninth in the vertical jump, and tied for 13th in the broad jump. Chark also attended a private workout for the Dallas Cowboys and pre-draft visits with the Buffalo Bills and Denver Broncos. At the conclusion of the pre-draft process, Chark was projected to be a second round pick by NFL draft experts and scouts. He was ranked the fifth best wide receiver prospect in the draft by DraftScout.com, was ranked the sixth best wide receiver by Scouts Inc., and was ranked tenth best wide receiver by Sports Illustrated.

Jacksonville Jaguars
The Jacksonville Jaguars selected Chark in the second round with the 61st overall pick in the 2018 NFL Draft. Chark was the eighth wide receiver drafted in 2018.

2018 season
On May 25, 2018, the Jacksonville Jaguars signed Chark to a four-year, $4.44 million contract that includes a signing bonus of $1.31 million. In the Jaguars' Week 2 victory over the New England Patriots, Chark recorded his first professional reception, which went for 13 yards. However, he did lose the ball on a fumble on the same play. 

Chark finished his rookie year with 14 receptions for 174 receiving yards. He was also the Jaguars primary kick returner.

2019 season
During Week 1 against the Kansas City Chiefs, Chark caught four passes for 146 yards and a touchdown as the Jaguars lost 40–26, the best yards-per-reception in a game by a Jaguar. In Week 2 against the Houston Texans, Chark caught seven passes for 55 yards and one touchdown as the Jaguars lost 13–12. In Week 3 against the Tennessee Titans, Chark caught four passes for 76 yards and his third receiving touchdown of the season in the 20–7 win. In Week 5 against the Carolina Panthers, Chark caught eight passes for 164 yards (#8 in franchise history) and two touchdowns in the 34–27 loss. In Week 11 against the Indianapolis Colts, Chark caught eight passes for 104 yards and two touchdowns in the 33–13 loss. Overall, Chark finished the 2019 season with 73 receptions for 1,008 receiving yards (the fifth Jaguar to reach 1,000 receiving yards in franchise history) and eight receiving touchdowns and a two-point conversion, leading the team in scoring by a non-kicker. He was named to the Pro Bowl.

2020 season
In Week 4 against the Cincinnati Bengals, Chark caught eight passes for 95 receiving yards and two receiving touchdowns during the 33–25 loss. In Week 9 against the Houston Texans, Chark had seven receptions for 146 receiving yards, including a 73-yard receiving touchdown, in the 27–25 loss. He finished the 2020 season with 53 receptions for 706 receiving yards and five receiving touchdowns.

2021 season
On August 8, it was revealed that Chark had surgery to repair a broken finger. The injury was not as serious as Chark was expected to be ready by the start of the season. Chark suffered a fractured ankle during the Jaguars Week 4 game against the Cincinnati Bengals in the first quarter in the 24–21 loss. He was placed on injured reserve on October 4, 2021. He played in four games and totaled seven receptions for 154 yards and two touchdowns in the 2021 season. At the time of his trade, he was in the top 10 in Jaguars franchise history in receiving touchdowns (#7t), yards per reception (#5), and 100-yard games (#7t).

Detroit Lions
On March 17, 2022, Chark signed a one-year, $10 million contract with the Detroit Lions. He suffered an ankle injury in Week 3, missed the next two games, before being placed on injured reserve on October 22, 2022. He was activated on November 19. The week after recording a touchdown in Week 12 against Buffalo Bills, in Chark's third game back he had five receptions for 98 yards in a blowout of his former team Jacksonville. The following week, he had 94 yards and a touchdown in a win over the Minnesota Vikings. In the season finale, Chark had just three receptions for 14 yards, but two were critical 4th-down conversions to set up the game winning touchdown, and kill the clock to eliminate the rival Green Bay Packers from the playoffs. On the season, Chark's 502 yards in the 11 games he played were third-best for the 9-8 Lions, behind Amon-Ra St. Brown and Kalif Raymond.

NFL career statistics

References

External links

Detroit Lions bio
LSU Tigers bio

1996 births
Living people
Sportspeople from Alexandria, Louisiana
Players of American football from Louisiana
American football wide receivers
LSU Tigers football players
Jacksonville Jaguars players
American Conference Pro Bowl players
Detroit Lions players